Transco may refer to:

Transco, former name of National Grid Gas plc, part of British utility company National Grid plc
National Transmission Corporation, known as TransCo, a government corporation which owns the electricity grid of the Philippines
Transcontinental Pipeline, a natural gas company in the United States
Transmarine Corporation shipping